Cladonia subulata is a species of fruticose, cup lichen in the family Cladoniaceae. It was first described as a new species by Swedish taxonomist Carl Linnaeus in 1753. It was transferred to the genus Cladonia by Friedrich Heinrich Wiggers in 1780. In North America, the lichen is colloquially known as the antlered powderhorn or antlered cup lichen.

References

subulata
Lichen species
Lichens of North America
Lichens described in 1753
Taxa named by Carl Linnaeus